The Canada China International Film Festival (CCIFF) is an annual film festival held primarily in Montreal, Quebec, Canada. CCIFF promotes the exchange between the Chinese and Canadian film culture, fosters cooperation, and encourages communication between artists and filmmakers. The festival is a platform for innovation and creation by showcasing the latest entertainment technology.

CCIFF is officially acknowledged and supported by the following authorities: China Film Administration (previously as State Administration of Press, Publication, Radio, Film and Television of The People’s Republic of China); Telefilm Canada; China Film Producers’ Association; China Film Group Corporation; China Film Archive; Embassy of the People’s Republic of China in Canada; Consulate General of the People's Republic of China in Montreal; City Hall of Montreal; National Film Board of Canada; SODEC (Société de Développement des Entreprises Culturelles); QFTC (The Quebec Film and Television Council); Concordia University, Shanghai International Film Festival Committee; Beijing International Film Festival Committee; Beijing Normal University Documentary Center; Chinese Culture Translation and Studies Support, and others.

The festival is run by Canada China Art-Tech (CCAT), a non-profit organization dedicated to promoting and understanding cultural differences in the film industry between Canada and China. CCAT stimulates cultural dialogue between the two nations by connecting stakeholders in the fields of art, technology and digital interactive media in order to provide them with opportunities for collaboration abroad. CCAT works in film, television, virtual reality, augmented reality, digital content and new media entertainment.

Events 
Seven sections are included in the festival every year: the Opening Ceremony, Film Screening and Competition, Women's Voice in Film and Television, Entertainment Technology Summit & B2B, Master Class, Academic Seminar, and the Gala and Awards Ceremony.

Opening ceremony 

The opening ceremony of the Canada China International Film festival is held in Montreal, Toronto and Ottawa. Around 100 audiences and guests, including government officials, celebrities, directors and filmmakers from both Canada and China, attend the opening ceremony annually.

Film Screenings 

In-person film screening are held for 3 consecutive days during the film festival in locations around Montreal including Cineplex, BanQ, Cinémathèque québécoise, Cinema Moderne, Cinema du Parc and Musee du Beaux Arts. Online film screenings are held for one month on the Smart Cinema platform. The festival screens 40 remarkable films with various genres of films and television shows including features, documentaries, short films and animated films.

Competition 

The film competition section is one of the core programs of CCIFF. The Jury selects around 40 films in the Screening section from more than 100 submissions. About 30 films are selected to enter the final round of competition. The jury then determines 26 award winners at the final round as well as 4 TV awards.

Entertainment technology summit and B2B 

The Entertainment Technology Forum is an important platform for technology exchanges and academic discussion in the film festival. The guests include executives and leaders from Cirque du Soleil, Disney, IBM, and Google. Like, Nasim Sedaghat (IBM Product Manager),  Jacques Méthé (Chairman of Cirque du Soleil), Rajesh Sharma (Technical Director of Disney Animation Studios), and Paul Debevec (Senior Researcher from Google), etc.

History 
In 2016, Prime Minister Justin Trudeau visited China on September 2. He wanted to make a stronger and more stable long-term relationship with China. Bardish Chagger announced new tourism initiatives. In 2016, CCIFF held several events in the special section to celebrate the China-Canada year of People-To-People and Culture Exchanges, including a summit forum on audiovisual exchanges and communication, a master class, and an industry tour.

In 2017, CCIFF added TV Drama section to the Film Screening section. This year CCIFF celebrates Canada's 150th anniversary, Montreal's 375th anniversary, and the 70th anniversary of People's Liberation Army of China. A script competition is also included in the Canada China Co-production Project Pitch.

The festival attracted more people thanks to the year of Canada-China tourism in 2018. The aim of the international film festival is to promote the cultural exchanges between China and Canada, cooperation and communication are also want to be developed and encouraged by both countries. In addition, the newest innovations in entertainment technology will be shown by forum and technology exhibition.

The year 2019 was the 70th anniversary of the founding of the People's Republic of China. On this occasion, the Canada China International Film Festival kicked off its 4th edition with the opening film "Enter the Forbidden City", directed by Mei Hu as well as other excellent Chinese world premieres during its screening program.

In 2020, the 5th CCIFF was adjusted due to the COVID-19 pandemic and was divided into two parts: The Entertainment Technology Summit and the Online Film Screening. From September 18 to December 18, 2020, three forum activities were successfully held online. The screening component was held from April 1 to 30, 2021 where a total of 10 films from China, Canada and the United States were screened.

In 2021, the opening cocktail reception for the 6th edition of the CCIFF kicked off at McCord Museum. CCIFF has been adjusted to a hybrid format consisting of offline and online events due to health and safety-related mandates brought on by the COVID-19 pandemic. As a result, events were held offline and online throughout the festival, from October 2, 2021, to November 30, 2021.  In addition, the screening month was held from October 22 to November 30, 2021, where a total of 23 films from China, Canada and the United States were shown.

Awards

Media coverage 
The Canada China International Film Festival (CCIFF) has been featured in many national and international news outlets such as Mtl Blog, The Montreal Times Newswire, The Hollywood Reporter, Global News,Timeout Market, CBC Radio, Radio Canada, and Cult MTL.

References

External links
 
 

Asian-Canadian culture in Montreal
Chinese-Canadian culture
Film festivals in Montreal
Chinese Canadian organizations